Wilfried Nancy (born 9 April 1977) is a French soccer manager who is the current head coach of Major League Soccer club Columbus Crew. He was formerly a professional footballer, and played as a defender.

Early life
Nancy was born in Le Havre to a Guadeloupean father and Senegalese-Cape Verdean mother. His father was in the French navy, and Nancy spent his early childhood in different regions, including Guadeloupe, Martinique, Djibouti and Réunion. At the age of 11, his family moved to Toulon and there he started playing organized soccer before moving to the academy of Toulon at the age of 14.

Career
Nancy was a professional footballer in France, and began his career with Toulon. He also had stints at various amateur and semi-professional clubs, including Beaucairois, Raon-l'Étape, Ivry, Noisy-le-Sec, Châtellerault, and Orléans before moving to Canada in August 2005 to play with the UQAM team.

Managerial career
In 2005, Nancy became a coach for Collège Stanislas, while at the same time playing for his university team, UQAM Citadins. His time at UQAM was brief, but remarkable, as he was voted most valuable player in Quebec, in addition to being named to the first all-star team in Quebec and Canada. He also helped the Citadins finish second in the Quebec conference. After retiring as a footballer, Nancy became a full-time coach in 2006 and started coaching AAA soccer; the highest amateur league level in Québec. He coached Québec's provincial teams from 2007, and was also assistant technical director of the Association régionale de soccer de la Rive-Sud in 2008.

He was part of the Montreal Impact Academy since its inception in 2011 starting with the U18s, then the U21s in 2014, followed by the U16s from 2014 to 2015. He was promoted to assistant coach for the first team on 7 January 2016. 

On 8 March 2021, following Thierry Henry's resignation, Nancy was promoted to head coach for CF Montréal becoming the club's first coach following their re-branding from the Impact name. On 28 May 2021, after just seven games as head coach, it was announced that CF Montréal had exercised its option on Nancy's contract for the 2022 season. Nancy lead CF Montréal to the final of the 2021 Canadian Championship, beating Toronto FC 1–0, qualifying them for the 2022 CONCACAF Champions League.

During the 2022 Major League Soccer season, Nancy's CF Montréal lost in the quarterfinals of the CONCACAF Champions League to Cruz Azul. On 9 July, Nancy and Montréal owner Joey Saputo got into a verbal altercation, with Saputo wanting to voice his frustration with the club's loss to bottom of the table Sporting KC. After that incident, Nancy requested to leave immediately, but changed his mind after discussing it with his players. Nancy finished the 2022 regular season with the second-best record in the East and set a franchise-record with 20 wins and 65 points in the regular season. During the playoffs, CF Montréal would end up losing to New York City FC in the conference semifinals. Nancy narrowly lost the MLS Coach of the Year award, losing by one-tenth of a percentage point to Jim Curtin. Due to a clause in his contract, Nancy's 2023 contract option was automatically triggered by the club making the 2022 MLS Cup Playoffs. 

Nancy was announced as the Columbus Crew head coach on December 6, 2022 after the Crew were required to compensate Montréal since Nancy was still under contract.

Managerial statistics

Honors

Manager
CF Montréal
Canadian Championship: 2021

References

External links
 FDB Profile

1977 births
Living people
Footballers from Le Havre
French footballers
French football managers
French people of Guadeloupean descent
French sportspeople of Cape Verdean descent
French sportspeople of Senegalese descent
SC Toulon players
US Raon-l'Étape players
US Orléans players
CF Montréal coaches
Ligue 2 players
Championnat National players
Championnat National 2 players
Championnat National 3 players
Major League Soccer coaches
Association football defenders
French expatriate footballers
French expatriate sportspeople in Canada
Expatriate soccer players in Canada